Citrogramma is a genus of hoverfly.

Species
C. amarilla Mengual, 2012
C. arisanicum (Shiraki, 1930)
C. asombrosum Mengual, 2012
C. australe Thompson, 2012
C. bicornutum Vockeroth, 1969
C. chola Ghorpadé, 1994
C. circumdatum (Meijere, 1908)
C. citrinoides Wyatt, 1991
C. citrinum Brunetti, 1923
C. clarus (Hervé-Bazin, 1923)
C. currani Ghorpadé, 2012
C. difficile (Curran, 1928)
C. distinctum Thompson, 2012
C. fascipleura (Curran, 1931)
C. flavigenum Wyatt, 1991
C. frederici Mengual & Ghorpadé, 2012
C. fumipenne (Matsumura, 1916)
C. gedehanum (Meijere, 1914)
C. henryi Ghorpadé, 1994
C. hervebazini (Curran, 1928)
C. luteifrons (Meijere, 1908)
C. luteopleurum Mengual, 2012
C. marissa Mengual, 2012
C. matsumurai Mengual, 2012
C. notiale Vockeroth, 1969
C. pendleburyi (Curran, 1928)
C. pennardsi Mengual, 2012
C. pintada Mengual, 2012
C. pinyton Mengual, 2012
C. quadratum Mengual, 2012
C. quadricornutum Vockeroth, 1969
C. robertsi Wyatt, 1991
C. schlingeri Thompson, 2012
C. sedlacekorum Vockeroth, 1969
C. shirakii Mengual, 2012
C. solomonensis Wyatt, 1991
C. triton Mengual, 2012
C. variscutatus (Curran, 1928)
C. vockerothi Wyatt, 1991
C. wyatti Mengual, 2012

References

External links
 http://www.papua-insects.nl/insect%20orders/Diptera/Syrphoidea/Syrphoidea.htm
 https://www.researchgate.net/figure/251543675_fig9_Figure-3-World-distribution-of-Citrogramma-Vockeroth-The-limit-shown-is-only-an

Diptera of Australasia
Diptera of Asia
Hoverfly genera